Son jalisciense is a variety of Mexican son music from which modern mariachi music is derived. This son also relied on the same basic instruments, rhythms and melodies as the sones of Veracruz and other locations, using the same string instruments. By the 19th century, Son jalisciense developed to be played with one vihuela, two violins and a guitarrón (which replaced the harp). The best known song of this type of son is called “La Negra”. Modern mariachi developed when brass instruments such as trumpets were added.

Son jalisciense has both instrumental and vocal songs in this form, mostly in major keys. It is performed by mariachi ensembles. It has an alternating rhythmic pattern in the harmony (guitars, vihuela) and guitarrón.

See also
Mariachi
Mexican son music
Son calentano
Son jarocho
Son huasteco

References

Regional styles of Mexican music
Mariachi